The Mark of the Lash is a 1911 Australian silent film. It is a convict-era melodrama made by the husband-and-wife team of John and Agnes Gavin.

Plot
The movie broke into the following chapters:
Love's Young Dream.
An Insult. The Traitor.
The Secret Marriage. Arrest of Dennis Blake.
Transported for Life.
Botany Bay Settlement.
On the Triangle. The Recognition.
The Mark of the Lash.
The Confession. Kind-Hearted Warder.
A Sensational Escape.
A Cold Bath. The Police Baffled.
Black Sal's Strategy.
Rescue of the Governor's Daughter.
Acquitted.
A Good Friend. The Dismissal of Captain Morley.

Cast
John Gavin

Production
It was the only movie Gavin made for the Australian Photo-Play Company, and was the last of four he had made in association with Stanley Crick and Herbert Finlay before setting up his own company in July 1911.

The movie was announced as being completed and available for screening by July 1911, but does not appear to have been released until the following year.

Release
During a screening in Toowoomba an Irish member of the audience took exception to a scene where a convict was being flogged and attacked the screen before being guided back to his seat.

References

External links

1911 films
Australian black-and-white films
Australian silent feature films
Films directed by John Gavin
Australian drama films
1911 drama films
Melodrama films
Silent drama films